Werner Jernström (5 January 1883 – 29 April 1930) was a Swedish sport shooter who competed in the 1912 Summer Olympics and in the 1920 Summer Olympics.

In 1912 he won the bronze medal as member of the Swedish team in the 50 metre military rifle event.

In the 1912 Summer Olympics he also participated in the following events:

 600 metre free rifle - sixth place
 300 metre free rifle, three positions - twentieth place
 300 metre military rifle, three positions - 53rd place

Eight years later he finished fifth with the Swedish team in the team 300 metre military rifle, prone event. He also competed in the 300 metre military rifle, prone contest but his exact place is unknown.

References

External links
profile

1883 births
1930 deaths
Swedish male sport shooters
ISSF rifle shooters
Olympic shooters of Sweden
Shooters at the 1912 Summer Olympics
Shooters at the 1920 Summer Olympics
Olympic bronze medalists for Sweden
Olympic medalists in shooting
Medalists at the 1912 Summer Olympics
Sport shooters from Stockholm
19th-century Swedish people
20th-century Swedish people